Millstone Township is a township in Monmouth County, in the U.S. state of New Jersey. The Township is located within the Raritan Valley region and is a part of the New York metropolitan area. As of the 2020 United States census, the township's population was 10,376, a decrease of 190 (−1.8%) from the 2010 census count of 10,566, which in turn reflected an increase of 1,596 (+17.8%) from the 8,970 counted in the 2000 census.

The township was named after the Millstone River, a major tributary of the Raritan River, and whose name originated from an incident in which a millstone was dropped into the river. The headwaters for the Millstone River originate in the township.

History

Millstone was formed as a township by an act of the New Jersey Legislature on February 28, 1844, from portions of Freehold Township and Upper Freehold Township, as well as part of Monroe Township in Middlesex County. The portions taken from Monroe Township were relinquished in 1845. On May 29, 1937, portions of the township were taken to form the borough of Jersey Homesteads (now Roosevelt).

The township has been one of the state's highest-income communities. Based on data from the American Community Survey for 2013–2017, Millstone Township residents had a median household income of $156,891, ranked 9th in the state among municipalities with more than 10,000 residents, more than double the statewide median of $76,475.

Geography
According to the United States Census Bureau, the township had a total area of 37.18 square miles (96.30 km2), including 36.61 square miles (94.81 km2) of land and 0.58 square miles (1.49 km2) of water (1.55%).

There are two unincorporated communities within the township served by the United States Postal Service as post offices. Clarksburg is served by post office ZIP Code 08510 and Perrineville is served as ZIP code 08535. Other unincorporated communities and place names located entirely or partially within the township include Baird, Bairdsville, Bergen Mills, Burksville, Carrs Corner, Carrs Tavern, Charleston Springs, Disbrow Hill, Ely, Elys Corner, Fair Play, Hillhurt, Holmeson, Pine Hill, Smithburg, Stone Tavern and Sweetman.

The township borders Freehold Township, Manalapan Township, Roosevelt and Upper Freehold Township in Monmouth County; East Windsor and Robbinsville Township in Mercer County; Monroe Township in Middlesex County; and Jackson Township in Ocean County.

Major bodies of water

Due to the township's unique location in the center of New Jersey, it is the home of numerous headwaters for various important rivers, brooks, and streams that flow throughout the state. The township is located on a ridge within the geographic heartland of New Jersey. The township falls within the hillier terrain and fertile soil found in the Inner coastal plain, while a small sliver of the eastern border of the township (which borders Jackson Township) is located within the flat terrain and sandier soil found in the Outer coastal plain.

Much of the township is centrally located within the much larger Raritan Valley region's watershed (as many of its brooks and streams flow into the river). The township is the headwaters for the Millstone River, one of the most important tributaries of the aforementioned river. Part of the township also belongs to the Delaware Valley region's watershed, with the Assunpink Creek and the Doctors Creek flowing through the southern and western sections of the township bordering Upper Freehold Township. Part of the Assunpink Wildlife Preservation Area is located in the township, as well as in portions of Upper Freehold Township, Roosevelt and Robbinsville Township. The reservation offers wetlands and lakes for viewing migratory birds, in addition to mountain biking trails, bridle paths and hiking trails, operated under the supervision of the New Jersey Department of Environmental Protection Division of Fish and Wildlife. Turkey Swamp Park is another nature reservation which features wetlands, hiking trails, and even campgrounds, located in neighboring Freehold Township. The township is also one of only two municipalities in Monmouth County that are part of the Toms River watershed, most of which is located in Ocean County, as it rises from the Millstone and Jackson area, flowing southward through the Pine Barrens to the Barnegat Bay.

Other notable bodies of water within the township include:

Lakes
Assunpink Lake (located at Assunpink Wildlife Preservation Area)
Bulk's Lake (located at Charleston Springs Golf Course)
Perrineville Lake
Rising Sun Lake

Rivers
Barnegat Bay Watershed
Metedeconk River
North Branch Metedeconk River
Toms River

Delaware River Watershed
Assunpink Creek
Crosswicks Creek
Doctors Creek

Raritan Basin Watershed
Millstone River
Rocky Brook
Cranbury Brook
South River
Manalapan Brook

Ecology
According to the A. W. Kuchler U.S. potential natural vegetation types, Millstone Township, New Jersey would have an Appalachian Oak (104) vegetation type with an Eastern Hardwood Forest (25) vegetation form.

Demographics

2010 census

The Census Bureau's 2006–2010 American Community Survey showed that (in 2010 inflation-adjusted dollars) median household income was $134,909 (with a margin of error of +/− $15,849) and the median family income was $139,535 (+/− $20,761). Males had a median income of $92,222 (+/− $13,047) versus $66,090 (+/− $14,854) for females. The per capita income for the borough was $50,390 (+/− $5,755). About 0.4% of families and 0.3% of the population were below the poverty line, including 0.7% of those under age 18 and none of those age 65 or over.

2000 census
As of the 2000 United States census there were 8,970 people, 2,708 households, and 2,426 families residing in the township.  The population density was 244.0 people per square mile (94.2/km2).  There were 2,797 housing units at an average density of 76.1 per square mile (29.4/km2).  The racial makeup of the township was 97.83% White, 1.05% African American, 0.10% Native American, 1.43% Asian, 0.03% Pacific Islander, 0.61% from other races, and 0.94% from two or more races. Hispanic or Latino of any race were 3.51% of the population.

There were 2,708 households, out of which 52.8% had children under the age of 18 living with them, 81.4% were married couples living together, 5.5% had a female householder with no husband present, and 10.4% were non-families. 7.5% of all households were made up of individuals, and 2.1% had someone living alone who was 65 years of age or older.  The average household size was 3.28 and the average family size was 3.46.

In the township the population was spread out, with 32.8% under the age of 18, 4.5% from 18 to 24, 31.7% from 25 to 44, 25.0% from 45 to 64, and 6.0% who were 65 years of age or older.  The median age was 37 years. For every 100 females, there were 99.4 males. For every 100 females age 18 and over, there were 96.0 males.

The median income for a household in the township was $104,561, and the median income for a family was $106,116. Males had a median income of $74,333 versus $50,036 for females. The per capita income for the township was $58,285. About 3.8% of families and 4.9% of the population were below the poverty line, including 6.0% of those under age 18 and 4.8% of those age 65 or over.

Government

Local government
Millstone is governed under the Township form of New Jersey municipal government, one of 141 municipalities (of the 564) statewide that use this form, the second-most commonly used form of government in the state. The Township Committee is comprised of five members, who are elected directly by the voters at-large in partisan elections to serve three-year terms of office on a staggered basis, with either one or two seats coming up for election each year as part of the November general election in a three-year cycle. At an annual reorganization meeting, the council selects one of its members to serves as mayor and another as deputy mayor.

The Township Committee is Millstone's legislative body. It sets policies, approves budgets, determines municipal tax rates, and passes resolutions and ordinances to govern the town. The Committee also appoints citizen volunteers to advisory boards, the Zoning Board of Adjustment, committees, and commissions. The Committee may investigate the conduct of any department, officer or agency of the municipal government. They have full power of subpoena permitted by Statute.

, the Millstone Township Committee consists of Mayor Al Ferro (R, term on committee and as mayor ends December 31, 2023), Deputy Mayor Chris Morris (R, term on committee ends 2023; term as deputy mayor ends 2022), Eric Davis (R, 2024), Michael A. McLaughlin Jr. (R, 2023) and Tara Zabrosky (R, 2024).

In September 2018, Al Ferro was selected from three candidates nominated by the Republican municipal committee to fill the seat expiring in December 2019 that had been vacated by Robert Kinsey in August due to illness.

Federal, state, and county representation
Millstone Township is located in the 3rd Congressional District and is part of New Jersey's 12th state legislative district.

 

Monmouth County is governed by a Board of County Commissioners comprised of five members who are elected at-large to serve three year terms of office on a staggered basis, with either one or two seats up for election each year as part of the November general election. At an annual reorganization meeting held in the beginning of January, the board selects one of its members to serve as Director and another as Deputy Director. , Monmouth County's Commissioners are
Commissioner Director Thomas A. Arnone (R, Neptune City, term as commissioner and as director ends December 31, 2022), 
Commissioner Deputy Director Susan M. Kiley (R, Hazlet Township, term as commissioner ends December 31, 2024; term as deputy commissioner director ends 2022),
Lillian G. Burry (R, Colts Neck Township, 2023),
Nick DiRocco (R, Wall Township, 2022), and 
Ross F. Licitra (R, Marlboro Township, 2023). 
Constitutional officers elected on a countywide basis are
County clerk Christine Giordano Hanlon (R, 2025; Ocean Township), 
Sheriff Shaun Golden (R, 2022; Howell Township) and 
Surrogate Rosemarie D. Peters (R, 2026; Middletown Township).

Politics
As of March 2011, there were a total of 6,954 registered voters in Millstone Township, of which 1,159 (16.7%) were registered as Democrats, 2,621 (37.7%) were registered as Republicans and 3,171 (45.6%) were registered as Unaffiliated. There were 3 voters registered as Libertarians or Greens.

In the 2012 presidential election, Republican Mitt Romney received 65.5% of the vote (3,340 cast), ahead of Democrat Barack Obama with 33.3% (1,698 votes), and other candidates with 1.2% (60 votes), among the 5,134 ballots cast by the township's 7,344 registered voters (36 ballots were spoiled), for a turnout of 69.9%. In the 2008 presidential election, Republican John McCain received 62.8% of the vote (3,373 cast), ahead of Democrat Barack Obama with 34.8% (1,867 votes) and other candidates with 1.2% (64 votes), among the 5,368 ballots cast by the township's 7,032 registered voters, for a turnout of 76.3%. In the 2004 presidential election, Republican George W. Bush received 65.7% of the vote (3,289 ballots cast), outpolling Democrat John Kerry with 33.3% (1,668 votes) and other candidates with 0.6% (41 votes), among the 5,005 ballots cast by the township's 6,603 registered voters, for a turnout percentage of 75.8.

In the 2013 gubernatorial election, Republican Chris Christie received 80.0% of the vote (2,384 cast), ahead of Democrat Barbara Buono with 18.3% (544 votes), and other candidates with 1.7% (51 votes), among the 3,007 ballots cast by the township's 7,363 registered voters (28 ballots were spoiled), for a turnout of 40.8%. In the 2009 gubernatorial election, Republican Chris Christie received 75.8% of the vote (2,875 ballots cast), ahead of  Democrat Jon Corzine with 19.2% (729 votes), Independent Chris Daggett with 4.4% (167 votes) and other candidates with 0.3% (11 votes), among the 3,791 ballots cast by the township's 6,938 registered voters, yielding a 54.6% turnout.

Education
The Millstone Township Schools serve public school students in pre-kindergarten through eighth grade. As of the 2018–19 school year, the district, comprising three schools, had an enrollment of 1,109 students and 93.0 classroom teachers (on an FTE basis), for a student–teacher ratio of 11.9:1. Schools in the district (with 2018–19 enrollment data from the National Center for Education Statistics) are 
Millstone Township Primary School with 386 students in grades Pre-K–2, 
Millstone Township Elementary School with 321 students in grades 3–5 and 
Millstone Township Middle School with 400 students in grades 6–8.

Students in ninth through twelfth grades for public school attend Allentown High School in Allentown, as part of a sending/receiving relationship with the Upper Freehold Regional School District, which also includes students from Allentown and Upper Freehold Township. As of the 2018–19 school year, the high school had an enrollment of 1,206 students and 89.5 classroom teachers (on an FTE basis), for a student–teacher ratio of 13.5:1.

Infrastructure

Emergency services

Police
The township does not have a local police department. Millstone Township is patrolled by the New Jersey State Police.

EMS
The Millstone Township Fire Department provides EMS with a staffed ambulance, 24/7.  The Millstone Township First Aid Squad was closed in 2020.

Fire
The local fire department consists of 12 career firefighters that provide fire protection and first responder medical care between the hours of 6 am and 6 pm. Volunteer firefighters cover from 6 pm to 6 am. supported by on duty career firefighters.

Transportation

Roads and highways

Interstate 195 is the main highway serving Millstone Township. It crosses the southern part of Millstone, connecting to Upper Freehold and Jackson townships. Half of an interchange is located in Millstone (Exit 16 for CR 537) with the other half in Jackson.

CR 571, CR 524, CR 526, CR 527 and CR 537 are the main county highways which pass through Millstone. CR 539 also passes through the township, but there are no intersections prior to it entering Robbinsville Township/Upper Freehold on the south and East Windsor on the north. A small portion of Route 33 passes through the northern tip of Millstone prior to entering Manalapan and Monroe Township.

The New Jersey Turnpike (also known as Interstate 95) is accessible in neighboring Robbinsville Township (Exit 7A), East Windsor Township (Exit 8) and Monroe Township (Exit 8A).

Healthcare
Millstone Township is served by CentraState Healthcare System, which is affiliated with Rutgers Robert Wood Johnson Medical School, located in neighboring Freehold Township. The regional hospital is a 287-bed medical facility. CentraState Healthcare system also provides healthcare through its various family practices in communities across western Monmouth and southern Middlesex counties in central New Jersey. The next closest hospitals to the township are the Hamilton Division of Robert Wood Johnson University Hospital in nearby Hamilton Township, Penn Medicine Princeton Medical Center in nearby Plainsboro Township, and the Old Bridge Division of Raritan Bay Medical Center in nearby Old Bridge Township.

Notable people

People who were born in, residents of, or otherwise closely associated with Millstone Township include:

 Sydney Cummings (born 1999), footballer who plays as a defender for the Brown Bears and the Guyana women's national team
 Dave Gallagher (born 1960), MLB outfielder who played for nine seasons, for the New York Mets, Philadelphia Phillies, Baltimore Orioles, Anaheim Angels, Chicago White Sox and Cleveland Indians
 Andy Miller (born 1968), harness racing driver
 Julie Miller (born 1972), harness racing driver and trainer
 RZA (born 1969), member of Wu-Tang Clan
 Chris Smith (born 1987), basketball player for Hapoel Galil Elyon of the Israeli Liga Leumit
 J. R. Smith (born 1985), National Basketball Association player with the Cleveland Cavaliers
 Darrin Winston (1966–2008), Major League Baseball player who played two seasons for the Philadelphia Phillies

See also 
 Clarksburg Historic District
 Perrineville Historic District

References

External links

 Millstone Township official website
 Millstone Township Schools
 
 School Data for the Millstone Township Schools, National Center for Education Statistics
 Upper Freehold Regional School District

 
1844 establishments in New Jersey
Populated places established in 1844
Township form of New Jersey government
Townships in Monmouth County, New Jersey